Şehzade Mehmed Abdülkerim Efendi (also Mehmed Abdülkerim Osmanoğlu; 26 June 1906 – 3 August 1935) was an Ottoman prince, the son of Şehzade Mehmed Selim and Nilüfer Hanım. He was the grandson of Abdul Hamid II and Bedrifelek Kadın.

Early life
Şehzade Mehmed Abdülkerim was born on 26 June 1906 in the Yıldız Palace. His father was Şehzade Mehmed Selim, son of Abdul Hamid II and Bedrifelek Kadın, and his mother was Selim's fourth consort Nilüfer Hanım, an Abkhazian. He was educated at the Galatasaray College, Istanbul.

At the exile of the imperial family in March 1924, Abdülkerim and his family first settled in Damascus, then under French rule, and then in Jounieh, Lebanon. On that occasion, his mother divorced by his father and chose to stay in Istanbul, where she remarried.

Personal life
Abdülkerim's only wife was Nimet Hanım. She was born in Beirut, Lebanon in 1911. She was of Lebanese Maronite descent. They married in 1930 in Beirut, and she converted to Islam after her marriage. Failing to receive his father's approval for the marriage, the couple settled in Damascus, Syria. The two together had two sons, Şehzade Dündar Ali Osman Osmanoğlu (born 1930) and Şehzade Harun Osmanoğlu (born 1932). In later years, she settled in Istanbul with her son Harun, where she died on 4 August 1981.

Later life and death
In 1932 he left Damascus to become active in the independence movements of Uyghurs in China's Xinjiang, also called East Turkestan at the time. In 1933, he was invited to Japan by their government, presumably with an eye towards leveraging his status as the Ottoman pretender to aid the Japanese Empire in outreach to Central Asian Muslims in conflict with the Soviet Union.

Abdülkerim first went to Tokyo, but after he could not find the support he expected, he moved to East Turkestan to organize the people against Chinese rule. Upon the defeat of his weak forces, Abdülkerim first fled to India, and later sought asylum from the United States. He was found dead in a hotel room on 3 August 1935. He was buried in Mount Olivet Cemetery, Maspeth, Queens County, New York.

Ancestry

References

Islam in Japan
Foreign relations of Japan
1906 births
1935 deaths
Galatasaray High School alumni